Eurosat - CanCan Coaster is an enclosed roller coaster at Europa-Park in Rust, Germany. The ride is part of a refurbishment from the original Eurosat, which includes new track, some minor layout changes and a virtual reality experience that has its own separate station. Eurosat - CanCan Coaster opened in September of 2018.

History

Eurosat (1989–2017)

The ride originally opened in 1989 as Eurosat in the French area of the park, and was manufactured by Mack Rides.

The ride is situated inside a 45-metre (148 ft) high geodesic dome, a notable landmark in the park. It is themed to spaceflight.

Riders queue for the attraction in a covered waiting area at the front of the dome, before ascending up escalators to the station area. On leaving the station, the train climbs a spiral lift hill in the center of the dome, before continuing down a long course of drops and turns alongside lasers and light effects.

The ride has seven trains, although only six are operated at the same time. Each train can seat 16 people across eight rows. During regular operation, the ride can handle 1600 people per hour.

During special events, the exterior of the dome has been decorated. For example, during the winter season, the dome has been wrapped in a large ribbon, and during the 2006 FIFA World Cup the dome became a large soccer ball. Throughout the park's Halloween events, the dome is decorated as a giant pumpkin, and renamed as Pumpkin Coaster.

Since 2000, the ride has featured a techno soundtrack produced by the group Stark Fader, called In a 2nd Orbit. During Halloween and the winter season, the soundtrack is replaced with seasonal music.

Eurosat - CanCan Coaster (2018–present) 
In June 2017, Europa-Park announced that the ride would receive a major refurbishment entailing completely new track, some minor layout changes and a virtual reality experience that will have its own separate station. The park currently codenamed the refurbishment Eurosat 2.0. The refurbishment began on November 5, 2017. In January 2018 was known that the name would be Eurosat - CanCan Coaster and the coaster was themed after the Moulin Rouge. The Soundtrack was composed and produced by Eric Babak. The VR experience was made by Coastiality and themed to the 2017 film, Valerian and the City of a Thousand Planets, which has his own train station.

References

External links 

 Official page of the attraction at europapark.de 
 Official website of Stark Fader 

Steel roller coasters
Enclosed roller coasters
Roller coasters manufactured by Mack Rides
Roller coasters introduced in 1989
Roller coasters in Germany
Rides at Europa-Park